The Rolex Oyster Perpetual Day-Date is a COSC certified, self-winding chronometer manufactured by Rolex. Initially presented in 1956, the Day-Date was the first watch to display the date as well as the day, spelled in full.
The calendar display is offered in 26 languages.

Due to its association with the President of the United States and its imposing presence on the wrist, the Day-Date earned the nickname "The President." 

The Day-Date is one of Rolex's models made only in solid 18k yellow gold, 18k white gold, 18k everose gold (Rolex's version of 18k rose gold), and platinum (PT950). It also is the only model offered with the "President" bracelet in matching precious metals.

Rolex Stella
A variant of the Day-Date called the "Lacquered Stella" (now more commonly known as "Stella") was introduced to Middle Eastern and Asian markets in the 1970s. The Stella featured vivid, bright color dials and was rumored to be named after the American painter Frank Stella. A gold with yellow lacquered Stella sold at Christie's for $131,250 in 2019.

As of 2020, Rolex offers two sizes of the Rolex Day-Date: 40 mm and 36 mm.

Like the Rolex Day-Date, the Stella dial features the date and the day, spelled in full, but unlike the standard edition Day-Date which traditionally features dial colors in black, gold, or silver, the Stella features dial colors in red, orange, oxblood, blue, green, turquoise, peach, salmon, pink, yellow, or purple.

History 
Originally introduced in the 1970s, the Stella dial was considered unpopular due to the vibrancy of colors, as Rolex buyers preferred the more conservative Day-Date dials, like white, black, and silver.

Due to a limited production and the possibility Rolex destroyed several Stella pieces due to lack of commercial success, the Stella has become popular among vintage watch collectors and is considered to be an inspiration to newer Rolex models with vividly colored dials.

The Stella model with 18k gold and yellow lacquered dial is considered one of the rarest, with one selling at Christie's for US$131,250 in 2019, with another selling for 275,000 Swiss Francs (approximately US$300,000) at Phillips. In 2022, Monaco Legend Auctions brokered the sale of a yellow lacquered dial Stella for €650,000 (US $685,340). Other models with different dial color and band combinations have been sold for over CHF50,000.

In 2013, Rolex released a new Day-Date with vividly colored leather straps and matching colored dials that Rolex enthusiasts also dubbed "Stella."

In September 2020, Rolex introduced five new Oyster Perpetual watches featuring bright, vibrant colored, enamel lacquered dials like the original Stella from the 1970s.

Today, the Day-Date is available in 26 different languages English, Spanish, Dutch, Indonesian, Italian, Japanese, Latin, Arabic, German, Polish, Portuguese, Russian, Chinese, Danish, Basque, Catalan, Ethiopian, Finnish, French, Greek, Hebrew, Moroccan, Norwegian, Persian, Swedish and Turkish.

Famous wearers

 John F. Kennedy, 35th President of the United States; gifted a yellow gold Day-Date by his alleged mistress Marilyn Monroe for his birthday in 1962, engraved with the message "JACK / With love as always / from / MARILYN / May 29th 1962." This same birthday was where she performed Happy Birthday, Mr. President. The watch was never worn by Kennedy
 Lyndon B. Johnson, 36th President of the United States
 Richard Nixon, 37th President of the United States
 Gerald Ford, 38th President of the United States
 Ronald Reagan, 40th President of the United States
 Donald Trump, 45th President of the United States
 Warren Buffett, American billionaire investor
 Michael Jordan, American professional basketball player
 LeBron James, American professional basketball player
 Kevin Love, American professional basketball player
 Carmelo Anthony, American professional basketball player
 Jack Nicklaus, American professional golfer
 Tenzin Gytaso, 14th Dalai Lama
 Emeril Lagasse, American celebrity chef

Related pages 

 Rolex Daytona
 Rolex Datejust
 Rolex GMT Master II
 Rolex Milgauss
 Rolex Sea Dweller
 Rolex Submariner
 Rolex Yacht-Master

References 

Products introduced in 1956
Rolex watches